Radu Jude (born 28 March 1977) is a Romanian film director and screenwriter.

Biography 
In 2003, Jude graduated from the Film Directing Department of the Media University of Bucharest. He worked as an assistant director for feature films including Amen., directed by Costa-Gavras and The Death of Mr. Lazarescu, directed by Cristi Puiu. He directed several short films, among them Corp la corp (2003), Marea Neagră (2004), Lampa cu căciulă (2006) – the most awarded Romanian short film of all time, winner of grand prizes at Sundance, San Francisco, Los Angeles, Grimstad, Hamburg, Bilbao, Huesca, Trieste, Montpellier, Cottbus, Aspen, IndieLisboa, Brussels, Mediawave, Kraków, Almería, Valencia, Uppsala and selected, among others, at Toronto, Telluride, New Directors/New Films Festival, Tampere, Rotterdam. His short films Dimineața (2007) and Alexandra (2007) were selected in over 30 festivals, including Clermont-Ferrand, San Francisco, Cottbus, and Oberhausen (where he won the Grand Prix). Jude also directed over 100 commercials.

The Happiest Girl in the World is his feature debut. Before the theatrical release in Romania, Cea mai fericită fată din lume won the CICAE Prize at the Berlin International Film Festival, the FIPRESCI Award ( International Federation of Film Critics ) at the Sofia International Film Festival, the Prize for Best Screenplay at the Bucharest International Film Festival and FIPRESCI Prize at IndieLisboa. The film was selected in ACID Programme at 2009 Cannes Film Festival.

In 2011, he directed and produced the independent Film pentru prieteni. His feature film Everybody in Our Family (2012) premiered at the Berlinale Forum and received the Heart of Sarajevo Award and the Bayard d'Or in Namur, among other awards.

Jude's Aferim! won the Silver Berlin Bear for Best Director at the 2015 Berlin Film Festival. The movie was also nominated at Tribeca Film Festival, Mill Valley Film Festival, Hong Kong International Film Festival, AFI Fest, London Film Festival, and Berlin International Film Festival. The film was selected as the Romanian official entry for the Best Foreign Language Film at the 88th Academy Awards reaching the short list but was not nominated.

Jude returned to the Berlin International Film Festival in 2020 with his new film Uppercase Print, the story of Mugur Călinescu, a Romanian teenager who wrote protest graffiti messages against the communist regime of dictator Nicolae Ceaușescu and was subsequently apprehended and interrogated by the secret police. The film screened in the Forum section of the Berlinale as a world premiere. The film festival also featured his documentary film Ieșirea trenurilor din gară, co-directed with Adrian Cioflâncă.

Jude won the Golden Bear at the 2021 Berlin International Film Festival for Bad Luck Banging or Loony Porn.

Filmography

Director 
 În familie (TV series, 2002)
 Lampa cu căciulă (short, 2006)
 Alexandra (short, 2006)
 Dimineața (short, 2007)
 The Happiest Girl in the World (2009)
 Film pentru prieteni (2011)
 Everybody in Our Family (2012)
 O umbră de nor (short, 2013)
 Trece și prin perete (short, 2014)
 Aferim! (2015)
 Scarred Hearts (2016)
 Țara moartă (The Dead Nation) (documentary, 2017)
 I Do Not Care If We Go Down in History as Barbarians (2018)
 Ieșirea trenurilor din gară (documentary, 2020)
 Uppercase Print (2020)
 Bad Luck Banging or Loony Porn (2021) 
 Potemkinistii (2022)

Writer 
 Alexandra (short, 2006)
 Dimineața (short, 2007)
 Cea mai fericită fată din lume (2009)
 Stanka se pribira vkashti (2010)
 My Tired Father (co-writer, 2011)
 Film pentru prieteni (writer, 2011)
 Everybody in Our Family (screenplay, 2012)
 Trece și prin perete (writer, 2014)
 Aferim! (screenplay, 2015)
 Scarred Hearts (screenplay, based on the Max Blecher novel, 2016)
 Potemkinistii (2022)

Assistant director 
 Amen. (2002)
 Furia (2002)
 Moartea domnului Lăzărescu (2005)

Producer 
 Alexandra (2006)
 Film pentru prieteni (2011)
 Trece și prin perete (2014)

References

External links
 

1977 births
Film people from Bucharest
Romanian film directors
Living people
Silver Bear for Best Director recipients
Directors of Golden Bear winners